Pape Abdoulaye N'Daw (born 26 October 1993) is a Senegalese former footballer who played as a forward.

Career
Pape N'Daw started to play football in his country at Niary Tally, moving to Romania at age 19 to play for Dinamo București where he was seen as a new Lacina Traore of Romanian football. He made his Liga I debut for The Red Dogs on 28 July 2013 under coach Gheorghe Mulțescu in a 2–0 victory against FC Vaslui. He played only 4 Liga I games for Dinamo, including a appearance in a derby against Steaua and left the club returning at Niary Tally, then he went to play for Simba, Township Rollers and Persipura Jayapura from Indonesia, retiring from playing football at age 27, becoming a sports agent.

References

External links

1993 births
Living people
Senegalese footballers
Association football forwards
ASC Niarry Tally players
FC Dinamo București players
Liga I players
Persipura Jayapura players
Liga 1 (Indonesia) players
Senegalese expatriate footballers
Senegalese expatriate sportspeople in Romania
Expatriate footballers in Romania
Expatriate footballers in Indonesia
Association football agents